Scott Newkirk (born July 22, 1961) is a swimmer who represented the United States Virgin Islands. He competed in six events at the 1984 Summer Olympics.

References

External links
 

1961 births
Living people
United States Virgin Islands male swimmers
Pan American Games competitors for the United States Virgin Islands
Swimmers at the 1979 Pan American Games
Olympic swimmers of the United States Virgin Islands
Swimmers at the 1984 Summer Olympics
Place of birth missing (living people)